Luís Alberto Lehr Airport  is the airport serving Santa Rosa, Brazil.

It is operated by DAP.

History
The airport was commissioned on December 8, 1957.

Airlines and destinations

Access

See also

List of airports in Brazil

References

External links

Airports in Rio Grande do Sul
Airports established in 1957
Santa Rosa, Rio Grande do Sul